Astromeritis is a large village in the Morphou Department of the Nicosia District of Cyprus. By the 2001 census it had a total population of 2,361.

Green Line crossing
Astromeritis is the location of one of the six de facto crossings across the UN Buffer Zone between the area effectively controlled by the Republic of Cyprus and the Northern Cyprus. The town on the northern side of the border is Zodeia (Turkish: Bostancı). The crossing is only for vehicular traffic.

The crossing was opened on 31 August 2005.

References

Communities in Nicosia District
Border crossings of Cyprus